Kaleb W. Weis (born 1983/1984) is an American politician serving as a member of the South Dakota House of Representatives from the 2nd district. An HVAC specialist by trade, Weis was elected to the House in 2018 and assumed office in 2019.

Background 
A resident of Aberdeen, South Dakota, Weis attended Tripp-Delmont High School and the Lake Area Technical College. Weis and his wife, Kayla, have three children.

References 

Living people
Republican Party members of the South Dakota House of Representatives
People from Aberdeen, South Dakota
Year of birth missing (living people)
21st-century American politicians